Sadda Haq - My Life, My Choice is an Indian television series that premiered on Channel V India on 25 November 2013. The Times of India said the show features characters from a range of areas across the country that are not common on television shows.

Cast

Season 1

Main
 Harshita Gaur as Sanyukta Aggarwal
 Param Singh as Randhir Singh Shekhawat
 Gachui Homring as Kaustuki Sherpa
 Chirag Desai as Jignesh Patel
 Nisha Neha Nayak as Vidushi Kumar
 Ankit Gupta as Parth Kashyap
 Prince Dua as Khuswant Singh Kohli
 Manik Talwar as Sahil Kataria

Recurring 
 Krip Suri as Prof. Vardhan Suryavanshi
 Gaurav Chopra as Prof. Abhay Singh Ranawat
 Neeraj Khetarpal as Prof. Prem Kumar Chaudhary
 Sejal Shah as Mrs. Anjali Aggarwal
 Aaradhna Uppal as Mrs. Renuka Sanyal
 Mohit Chauhan as Mr. Kishore Aggarwal
 Kushabh Manghani as Ankit Aggarwal
 Harsh Vashisht as Mr. Harshvardhan Shekhawat
 Varun Sharma as Sameer Mittal
 Kunal Bakshi as Rana and Inspector Hooda

Season 2

Main Cast
 Harshita Gaur as Sanyukta Randhir Shekhawat (née Aggarwal) 
 Param Singh as Randhir Singh Shekhawat
 Ashwini Koul as Aryan
 Shabnam Pandey as Sanaya Jha
 Mohak Khurana as Joy Dasgupta
 Sneha Shah as Kritika Narayan Swamy
 Puneett Chouksey as Arjun Khanna
 Ali Merchant as Nirmaan Nambiar
 Charvi Saraf as Tanya
  Afzaal Khan

Recurring Cast 
 Simran Kapoor as Becky
 Mridula Choudhury as Mrs. Subramanyam
 Pooja Bisht as Minka
 Nisha Neha Nayak as Vidushi Kumar
 Ankit Gupta as Parth Kashyap
 Mohit Chauhan as Mr. Kishore Aggarwal
 Kushabh Manghani as Ankit Aggarwal
 Aaradhna Uppal as Mrs. Renuka Sanyal
 Harsh Vashisht as Mr. Harshvardhan Shekhawat
 Sharat Sonu as Bablu
 Kunal Singh

Character Synopsis 

A brief introduction to some of the characters in the show:

 Harshita Gaur portrays Sanyukta Aggarwal, she tries to overcome all hurdles in her life by stepping into the road not taken. Beautiful, Humble, and Kindhearted and extremely sensible.
 Param Singh portrays Randhir Singh Shekhawat, a sheer genius in his field of study, rude and arrogant yet kind and irresistible. The college's most popular handsome hunk.
 Nisha Neha Nayak portrays Vidushi Kumar, ambitious, aggressive, want achievements by any means necessary.
 Ankit Gupta portrays Parth Kashyap, calm and composed in nature, friendly and matured but his past haunts him every moment.
 Gachui Homring portrays Kaustuki Sherpa, honest, righteous but confused in nature.
 Chirag Desai portrays Jignesh Patel, known as Jiggy in college with a Gujarati lifestyle and accent, career oriented.
 Krip Suri portrays Prof. Vardhan Suryavanshi, the mentor of "Dream Team", genius, aggressive in nature, handles difficult students and forms the "Dream Team".
 Aaradhna Uppal portrays Mrs. Renuka Sanyal, Randhir's mother, a corporate woman and one of the members of board of trustees of FITE.
 Kushabh Manghani portrays Ankit Aggarwal, Sanyukta's elder brother, works in his father's company, supports the male dominance.
 Kunal Bakshi portrays Rana and Inspector Hooda, a corrupt police officer and a criminal.
 Afzaal Khan portrays Vikram Thakur, appointed as the Foreman in Sanyukta's father's company, carries out the internship programme.
 Meer Ali portrays  Prof. Vivek Chauhan, appointed as the new mentor of "Dream team", alcoholic, later terminated from the post. 
 Gaurav Chopra portrays Prof. Abhay Singh Ranawat, the new mentor of "Dream Team", appointed to groom them for the international college tech fest event, genius but alcoholic due to his troubled past.
 Ali Merchant portrays Nirmaan, a multi-layered intelligent guy and a passionate scientist and the director of "Indian Space Research Centre (ISRC)".

Production 

Mamta Yash Patnaik, Producer and Chief Creative Director of Beyond Dreams Production house and co-founder of Inspire films production house says "The audiences are evolving with each passing day. So the content needs to evolve too. The same emotions have to be told in a new refreshing manner which will connect with the youth. We wanted to give a different show not only in terms of content but also make it visually different. The key was to have a play out which is emotional and still not look like any GEC soap."

Yash A Patnaik, Chairman and Managing Director of Beyond Dreams Production house added "It's very exciting to produce youth shows because then you're not doing the regular things that are going on these days. You can break conventions and make your own rules with youth shows. It's a very unexplored space."

Season synopsis

Plot

Season 1 
Sanyukta Agarwal is a young and talented girl who has the dream to pursue Mechanical Engineering. But her conservative father opposes her decision as he believes Mechanical Engineering is only for boys while girls are meant to get married and do household chores. Sanyukta's mother is very supportive of her dreams but is scared of her husband. Sanyukta without the knowledge of her parents gives the entrance test for India's number one college FITE and Sanyukta got admission. With her mother's signature on the admission form Sanyukta joins FITE.
Randhir Singh Shekhawat is a sheer genius and a virtuoso. He often refers to himself as the best. Randhir has anger issues due to a troubled childhood. He is a male chavenist and believes men are better than women.Randhir and his best friend Karan gives the entrance test together however only Randhir manages to clear it. Karan can get an admission only if one student decides to give up their seat. Upon seeing a few girls in his batch he begins to threaten them to give up their admission or change the stream inorder to get Karan an admission. He and Sanyukta get into an altercation and thus begins their rivalry.
Sanyukta's father and brother find out about her admission and set out to bring her back home. She intentionally causes a blast in the laboratory which leads to a police investigation as a result of which she's detained at the college thus unable to go back home. Randhir gets furious as Sanyukta traps him in the situation as well.
Randhir is very distracted and not using his full intelligence towards the dream team. Vardhan asks Sanyukta to befriend him in order to bring back his attention to where it belongs and to help him overcome his inner problems. Sanyukta is very scekptical about it at first but then agrees. She prepares a scarp book highlighting hers and Randhir's journey so far. Randhir loves the gift and agrees to become her friend. Sanyukta continues to hide the fact that her engagement has not cancelled from Randhir. The dream team starts its serious preparation for the race while Sanyukta and Randhir start developing a deep friendship. Sanyukta feels guilty for hiding the truth about her engagement from Randhir but thinks this is best for the team and continues her lie. Soon the even Sanyukta develops feelings for him. Randhir tries to propose to her on many occasions but fails each time due to interruptions. Finally on the day of the race Sanyukta manages to qualify the team for the International competition but also sustains severe burns as the car catches fire. Randhir rescues her and takes care of her. She realizes that she is in love with him. Sanyukta is set to leave the college once and for all and tell Randhir the truth. But Vidushi with an intention to trouble Sanyukta puts up her Engagement invitation on the notice board. Randhir sees the invitation and gets livid. He sarcastically thanks Sanyukta for teaching him so much in life and tells her that he will never forget or forgive her for this betrayal. Heartbroken Sanyukta leaves for her home and hopes Randhir will forgive her someday.

Season 2

 
Sanyukta visits Parth in a hospital everyday for the past two years. She put her dream of working as a mechanical engineer aside after the international tech fest incident. She works in an IT company along with colleague and IT Engineer Aryan known to all by his desk extension number "235". Aryan falls in love with sanyukta.Her dad regrets for not supporting her dreams. Parth recovers from coma. YoYo opened an auto parts store. Sanyukta's brother and Vidushi are married and they return from Dubai. Sanyukta finally joins ISRC but becomes an intern of the project "Mission Mars 2020" led by Nirmaan, the director of ISRC. Joy, Kritika, Arjun and Sanaya are her colleagues. Meanwhile, Randhir enters ISRC for his friend Sanaya but becomes a member of the project. Randhir meets Sanyukta.
 
Mars Rover is being built up, the first step towards the mission. Randhir is the mechanical designer, Arjun looks after the suspension mechanics, Kritika is the coder, the logo designing comes under Joy's department and Botanist Sanaya looks after the soil level comparisons. Aryan finally becomes a member of the project and is the special consultant. Vidushi visits Sanyukta at ISRC and open up about Sanyukta's relationship with Randhir infront of her colleagues.

Awards and recognition 
Year - 2014 
Indian Telly Awards
Youth Show (Fiction) [Won]
Actor in a Supporting Role (Drama) - Krip Suri [Nominated]

Year - 2015
Indian Telly Awards
Youth Show [Won]

References

External links 

 
 

Channel V India original programming
Indian television soap operas
Indian drama television series
2013 Indian television series debuts
Television shows set in Uttarakhand
Indian teen drama television series
2016 Indian television series endings